Dead Drunk may refer to:

Books
Dead Drunk, novel by George Bagby 1952
Dead Drunk, novel by Arthur Porges 1959
Dead Drunk, novel by Hartley Howard  1974
"Dead Drunk: In Memoriam William Cannastra, 1924-1950", poem by Alan Ansen

Film and TV
Dead Drunk: the Kevin Tunell Story directed by Juan Jose Campanella HBO
Dead Drunk, 2002 film with Tom Georgeson, Andrew Schofield (actor) 
"Dead Drunk", episode of The Commish  1994 
Dead Drunk, 2012 horror movie with Alan Rowe Kelly

Music
Dead Drunk (album), by Terrestrial Tones
"Dead Drunk" song by Gorerotted from A New Dawn for the Dead  2005